This is a list of parliamentary by-elections in England held between 1701 and 1707, with the names of the previous incumbent and the victor in the by-election.

In the absence of a comprehensive and reliable source, for party and factional alignments in this period, no attempt is made to define them in this article. The House of Commons: 1690-1715 provides some guidance to the complex and shifting political relationships, but it is significant that the compilers of that work make no attempt to produce a definitive list of each members allegiances.

Dates
During this period England counted its legal year as beginning on 25 March. For the purposes of this list the year is considered to have started on 1 January.

By-elections
The c/u column denotes whether the by-election was a contested poll or an unopposed return. If the winner was re-elected, at the next general election and any intermediate by-elections, this is indicated by an * following the c or u. In a few cases the winner was elected at the next general election but had not been re-elected in a by-election after the one noted. In those cases no * symbol is used.

4th Parliament of William III (1701)

5th Parliament of William III (1701–1702)

1st Parliament of Anne (1702–1705)

2nd Parliament of Anne (1705–1707)

References

 
 Return of the name of every member of the lower house of parliament of England, Scotland, and Ireland, with name of constituency represented, and date of return, from 1213 to 1874.
 The House of Commons 1690-1715, edited by David Hayton (Cambridge University Press 2002)

External links
 History of Parliament: Members 1690-1715
 History of Parliament: Constituencies 1690-1715

By-elections 1701
By-elections to the Parliament of England
1700s in England
By-elections 1701 to 1707